Chauncey Wright Griggs was an American military officer and politician.

Early life 
Chauncey Wright Griggs was born on December 31, 1832, in Tolland, Connecticut, the 4th child and youngest son of farmer Chauncey Griggs and his wife, Hearty Dimock. In 1846 or 1847, at age 14, he went to work for his oldest brother, Stephen, in Birmingham, Ohio. This arrangement, however, "did not prove wholly congenial," and, after only a "few months" working for Stephen, Chauncey returned to the family home in Tolland, Connecticut. He attended high school at Monson Academy, graduating in 1850 or 1851. 

After graduation, Chauncey lived in several states, held a variety of jobs and attended a "commercial" college in Detroit, Michigan. On May 4, 1856, Chauncey arrived in St. Paul, Minnesota, where he would reside for the next 32 years.

Military 
Chauncey enlisted as a Captain in the 3rd Minnesota Volunteer Infantry Regiment in August or September or October 12 of 1861 and was promoted several times, holding the rank of Colonel at the time of his resignation, due to health issues, on July 15, 1863. He was held for "several" months at a Confederate prison in Madison, Georgia and "for a brief period" at Libby Prison in Richmond, Virginia after his regiment surrendered, despite his opposition which he expressed in "strong terms," on July 10 or 13, 1862 in Murfreesboro, Tennessee.

Political career 
Chauncey first held political office when he was elected Carver district representative in 1864. From 1876-1881, he was an alderman from the 4th ward of St. Paul, Minnesota. He served as a Democrat on the Minnesota Senate from 1866-1870 and 1881-1887 and was appointed to the St. Paul, Minnesota water board in 1882.

Personal life 
On April 9, 1859, he married Martha Gallup in Ledyard, Connecticut. Chauncey and Martha had 6 children together, 4 sons and 2 daughters, all of whom were born in Minnesota: Chauncey, Herbert, Heartie, Everett, Theodore and Anna.

Later life and death 
Chauncey and his family moved from St. Paul, Minnesota to Tacoma, Washington in 1888. He and several other wealthy lumbermen purchased land from the Northern Pacific Railroad Company in 1887 to form the St. Paul and Tacoma Lumber Company, of which Chauncey was chosen to be president. Chauncey died on October 29, 1910, in Tacoma of paralysis at the age of 78 and is buried in Tacoma Cemetery.

References

1831 births
1910 deaths
People from Chaska, Minnesota
People from Tolland, Connecticut
People of Minnesota in the American Civil War
Businesspeople from Minnesota
Democratic Party members of the Minnesota House of Representatives
Democratic Party Minnesota state senators